The plain-winged woodcreeper or thrush-like woodcreeper (Dendrocincla turdina) is a passerine bird belonging to the woodcreeper group, now classified in the ovenbird family, Furnariidae. It is sometimes considered to be a subspecies of the plain-brown woodcreeper (D. fuliginosa)

Diet 
The plain-winged woodcreeper has a diet that primarily consists of different types of arthropods. The plain-winged woodcreeper is a well-known follower of army ants, generally Eciton burchelli and occasionally Labidus praedator, using near-vertical perches usually 15 centimeters in diameter and at low to medium heights roughly 2-3 meters above ground when feeding on ants below it. They are less frequently observed using smaller trunks, down to .3 meters or up to 9 meters, when feeding. The plain-winged woodcreeper occasionally gathers prey from surfaces when above an ant colony and prefer to stay closer to the ground and are often seen in foliage, trunks, or other substrates. They sometimes capture other prey in mid air when hunting for flying beetles or flies native to their area. The plain-winged woodcreeper exhibits foraging habits as a survival adaptation, generally near the southern limits out the range of their primary food. In cold temperatures, army-ants become inactive. During the winter season, plain-winged woodcreepers rely on their foraging habits to find new sources of food.

The plain-winged wood creeper has been noted to be moderately aggressive within their same species when feeding or foraging. This has been observed especially when perched over an army-ant colony as a defensive act to protect their food. They have been known to push out smaller species of birds when eating, as well as having been pushed out by larger birds for similar reasons. They have been viewed participating in larger flocks of bird species, especially those led by cinereous antshrike (Thamnomanes caesius) in the northern part of its range. Some studies have also shown that they have been seen foraging with the black capuchin monkeys (Sapajus nigritus) on a regular basis, unless tending to a nest where they would then be seen foraging alone.

Description 
The plain-winged woodcreeper is roughly 19-21 cm (approximately 7.5-8.25 in). This medium-sized woodcreeper has a relatively large bill compared to its size. The straight bill is the same size as its head, which is ideal for catching bugs. The beak is both black and gray in coloring, with the bottom half being gray and the top half being a darker black. The bird itself is a solid brown color all around. The only distinctive features it has is a pale buff throat and a reddish-brown tail and rectrices. The tail is made up of stiff, wide feathers. Male and females have the same coloring and features, however, they differ in size. Females tend to be smaller than their male counterparts.  

The song is a long, non-musical repetition of “tchip-tchip-tchip” sounds.

Habitat 
The plain-winged woodcreeper occurs in eastern Brazil from Rio Grande do Sul north to Bahia. It is also found in north-east Argentina (Misiones Province) and eastern Paraguay. It inhabits the lower and middle levels of forest and woodland from the coast into the foothills.

References
 

Develey, Pedro F. & Endrigo, Edson (2004) Birds of Greater São Paulo, Aves e Fotos Editora, São Paulo.
Grosset, Arthur (2007) Plain-winged Woodcreeper (Dendrocincla turdina). Accessed 02/10/07.
Souza, Deodato (2002) All the Birds of Brazil: An Identification Guide, Dall.

External links

Xeno-canto: Dendrocincla turdina, recordings of the song
 Photos, videos and observations at Cornell Lab of Ornithologys Birds of the World

plain-winged woodcreeper
Birds of the Atlantic Forest
plain-winged woodcreeper